Teleiopsis terebinthinella is a moth of the family Gelechiidae. It is found in southern and south-eastern Europe, except the Iberian Peninsula and France. It has also been recorded from Turkey and the Near East.

Adults are on wing from June to July.

The larvae feed on Pistacia terebinthus and Rhus coriaria.

External links
Fauna Europaea

Teleiopsis
Moths of Europe
Insects of Turkey
Moths described in 1856